Dexamyl (or Drinamyl in the UK) was a brand name combination drug composed of sodium amobarbital (previously called amylbarbitone and its brand name Amytal) and dextroamphetamine sulfate (Dexedrine) within the same pill. It was widely abused, and is no longer manufactured.

First introduced in 1950 by Smith, Kline & French (SKF), Dexamyl was marketed as an anorectic obesity medication as well as an anxiolytic and antidepressant medication that did not cause agitation. Racemic amphetamine sulfate had already been marketed over-the-counter (OTC) since 1933 as a  nasal decongestant inhaler device under the brand name Benzedrine, and also as an oral tablet since 1938. Dexamyl utilized its enantiopure isomer of greater central nervous system (CNS) selectivity, dextroamphetamine sulfate, to elevate mood and suppress appetite, whereas the concomitant barbiturate was included to broadly counteract potential adverse effects from dextroamphetamine. Its name is a portmanteau of  dextro- amphetamine and amyl- barbitone.

Dexamyl was discontinued in 1982 by SKF in favor of monoamine oxidase inhibitors (MAOIs) and tricyclic antidepressants (TCAs) which were recently developed and shared treatment indications with Dexamyl yet lacked the high dependence potential and abuse liability which characterized long-term Dexamyl usage.

History
British prime minister Anthony Eden was prescribed Dexamyl; he was using it to treat abdominal pain. It has been suggested that the drug impaired his judgment during the Suez Crisis. The failure of his Suez policies led to his ousting while he was recovering in Jamaica.

In Britain during the early 1960s the drug was taken by "tired housewives", and was also abused by youths who took excessively large doses and nicknamed the triangular blue tablets "purple hearts" or "blues." This became a celebrated part of the Mod subculture. Dexamyl was the recreational drug of choice for main character of the film Quadrophenia, who eventually suffers from amphetamine psychosis. They were widely abused.

In the late 1960s and early 1970s, Dexamyl spansules—a clear and green capsule containing green and white "beads"—became popular as a street-drug upper nicknamed "Christmas trees", a reference to its appearance.

In his autobiography My Life of Absurdity, author Chester Himes writes of his use of Dexamyl in the mid-1950s. He also writes that he stopped taking the drug after his friend Vandi Haygood died from "steady doses of Dexamyl".

Dr. George C. Nichopoulos was indicted in May 1980 for having improperly prescribed Dexamyl and phenmetrazine (Preludin) to the singer Jerry Lee Lewis, despite knowing he was addicted to them. 

Dr. Patrick A. Mazza, team physician for the Reading Phillies, said he prescribed Dexamyl, Eskatrol, Dexedrine, and Preludin for Steve Carlton, Larry Christenson, Tim McCarver, Pete Rose, Larry Bowa, and Greg Luzinski. The charges against Mazza were dropped after he contended that he had provided the prescriptions in good faith to the baseball players at their request. The pill was writer Terry Southern's drug of choice for many years.

See also
Amfecloral, a single molecule with a similar effect (due to metabolites).
Desbutal, another pharmaceutical containing an amphetamine and a barbiturate.
D-IX, an experimental drug containing methamphetamine, cocaine & oxycodone.
 The song "Big Black Smoke" by the Kinks makes reference to the drug with the lyric "And every penny she had was spent on purple hearts and cigarettes."
Dexy's Midnight Runners

References

Substituted amphetamines
Barbiturates
Combination drugs